Cornettsville is an unincorporated community in Perry County, Kentucky, United States, within the state's eastern mountain region known for coal mining. The population is 792 as of the 2000 United States Census. The town was named for one of the early pioneers to the area, William Jesse Cornett, whose log cabin and burial site can still be seen today.

Geography

The town is located in the Eastern Mountain Coal Fields region of Kentucky and it is in the eastern time zone of the United States. The zip code for Cornettsville is 41731.

References

Unincorporated communities in Perry County, Kentucky
Unincorporated communities in Kentucky
Coal towns in Kentucky